Sydney Keith Allison (August 26, 1942 - November 17, 2021) was an American musician and composer, best known as a member of Paul Revere & the Raiders from 1968 to 1975.

Music 
Allison began working as a professional solo artist and session musician in the early 1960s. Allison played guitar and harmonica on Sonny & Cher's song “The Beat Goes On”. A year later, Columbia Records signed Keith and released his debut album Keith Allison in Action.

Where The Action Is 
He would gain notoriety in 1965, when he became a regular act on the Los Angeles-based show, Where the Action Is. Reportedly, Allison was brought in as a regular on Where The Action Is, due to his resemblance to Paul McCartney, after being spot on cameras as a member of the audience on the first episode of the show:

Paul Revere & the Raiders 
In 1968, Allison joined Paul Revere & the Raiders as their bassist. Keith played on their albums Something Happening (1968), Hard ‘N’ Heavy (1969), Alias Pink Puzz (1969), Collage (1970), Indian Reservation (which included the song Indian Reservation (The Lament of the Cherokee Reservation Indian), which would become the group's first number one charting song) (1971), and Country Wine (1972). Around the time Allison joined the Raiders, the group's sole original members, Mark Lindsay and Paul Revere, had recently started hosting the show Happening '68. Allison and the additional members of the Raiders would become the house band for the show until its cancellation in 1969.

Allison left the Raiders in 1975.

Composing 
Allison scored the 1972 film Where Does It Hurt?, and wrote and sang the title song. Allison recorded the song “Sail Away” with Harry Nilsson. He worked with Starr on his 1978 album Bad Boy, also serving as the musical director for his TV special, Ringo, the same year. Also in 1978, he composed music for the film Sgt. Pepper's Lonely Hearts Club Band, starring The Bee Gees.

Keith performed on songs recorded by various artists, including The Monkees, Sonny & Cher, Harry Nilsson, and Ringo Starr. Keith also recorded and performed with Roy Orbison, The Beach Boys, The Righteous Brothers, Chuck Berry, Alice Cooper, Ricky Nelson, The Crickets and Johnny Rivers.

Acting 
Keith played minor roles in numerous shows and films, starting with the role of “Hinkley” in Where Does It Hurt? (1972). In most of the roles he played, he also did work in the composing of the music in the film. Allison played Captain James J. White in the 2003 film Gods and Generals.

Keith played a croupier in a 1978 episode of The Love Boat. He played the character “Ray” in two episodes of 7th Heaven and “Pete Weston” in Blossom. In addition, he had a small cameo in the 1978 film Sgt. Pepper's Lonely Hearts Club Band, starring the Bee Gees, and played a pirate called Buck in the 1999 film Treasure At Pirate’s Point. Allison played a groom in the 2022 film Cuddly Toys, which was released after his death.

Personal life 
Allison was born in Coleman, Texas and raised in San Antonio. His cousin was Jerry Allison, drummer for The Crickets. Jerry Allison died in 2022. Keith was married to a woman called Tina for more than 40 years. Their son, Ryeland, is also a music producer. Keith had seven grandchildren.

Death 
Allison died on November 17, 2021, in Sherman Oaks, Los Angeles at the age of 79. Celebrities such as Ringo Starr and Mickey Dolenz shared their condolences on social media. The official social media account for Paul Revere & the Raiders would post:

Discography 

 Keith Allison In Action (1967) (solo)
 Something Happening (1968) (Paul Revere & the Raiders)
 Hard 'N' Heavy (with Marshmallow) (1969) (Paul Revere & the Raiders)
 Alias Pink Puzz (1969) (Paul Revere & the Raiders)
 Collage (1970) (Paul Revere & the Raiders)
 Indian Reservation (1971) (Paul Revere & the Raiders)
 Country Wine (1972) (Paul Revere & the Raiders)
 All-Time Greatest Hits (1972) (Paul Revere & the Raiders)

Filmography 

 It’s Happening (1968) (composer)
 Head (1968) (music department)
 Where Does It Hurt? (1972) (composer and role of Hinkley)
 Phantom of the Paradise (1974) (role of Country and Western singer)
 Sextette (1977) (role of waiter)
 Ringo (1978) (music department)
 Sgt Peppers Lonely Hearts Club Band (1978) (role of Guest)
 The Love Boat (1978) (role of croupier; one episode)
 The Night The Lights Went Out In Georgia (1981) (music consultant and role of Musician)
 Blossom (1993) (role of Pete Weston; two episodes)
 Left Luggage (1998) (composer)
 A Rock and a Hard Place (1998) (composer)
 Treasure of Pirate’s Point (1999) (role of Buck)
 Fly Boy (1999) (role of Store Manager)
 7th Heaven (1998-2001) (role of Ray; two episodes)
 Don’t Let Go (2002) (composer)
 30 Days Until I’m Famous (2004) (music technical advisor)
 Cuddly Toys (2022) (role of Groom; posthumous release)

Note:

References 

1942 births
2021 deaths